Omidenepag, sold under the brand name Eybelis among others, is a medication used for the treatment of glaucoma and ocular hypertension.

Omidenepag was approved for medical use in Japan in 2018, and in the United States in September 2022.

Medical uses
Omidenepag is indicated for the treatment of glaucoma and ocular hypertension.

Adverse effects
The most common adverse effects of omidenepag are conjunctival hyperemia and macular edema, including cystoid macular edema.

Pharmacology
Omidenepag isopropyl is a prodrug that is converted by hydrolysis of its isopropyl ester to the active metabolite omidenepag. Omidenepag is a selective prostaglandin E2 receptor agonist.

History
Omidenepag was developed by Ube Industries and Santen Pharmaceutical.

References

External links 
 
 
 
 

Cosmetics chemicals
Hair loss medications
Ophthalmology drugs
Prodrugs
Pyrazoles
Isopropyl esters
Aminopyridines
Sulfonamides